Norbourg is a Canadian drama film, directed by Maxime Giroux and released in 2022. A dramatization of the real-life Norbourg scandal of 2005, the film stars François Arnaud as company president Vincent Lacroix, and Vincent-Guillaume Otis as vice-president Éric Asselin.

The cast also includes Christine Beaulieu, Alexandre Goyette and Guy Thauvette.

The film was slated to premiere on February 5, 2022, at the Festival Vues dans la tête de... film festival in Rivière-du-Loup, Quebec; however, due to the organizers' decision in January to cancel the planned in-person screenings and shift to an online model in light of the continued COVID-19 pandemic in Quebec, it did not premiere at that time. The film had its commercial premiere on April 22.

References

External links

2022 films
2022 drama films
Canadian drama films
Films set in Quebec
Films shot in Quebec
Films directed by Maxime Giroux
Canadian films based on actual events
French-language Canadian films
2020s Canadian films